Gérard Pussey (born 20 June 1947) is a French writer and novelist.

Born in Villeneuve-Saint-Georges. A journalist and literary critic, Pussey is first of all a novelist. Initiated to literature by his uncle, the writer and screenwriter René Fallet, Pussey is winner of the prix Roger Nimier, (1980), the prix  and that of the Société des gens de lettres. He appeared several times on the last lists of the prix Renaudot and the prix Interallié.

Work 
Novels
 Châteaux en Afrique, Éditions Denoël – prix du premier roman.
 L'Homme d'intérieur, Denoël – prix Roger-Nimier and prix littéraire de la vocation.
 L'amour tombé du lit, Denoël – prix Contrepoint
 Piquanchâgne, Médium – prix de la Société des gens de lettres
 Robinson malgré lui, Nil
 Nous deux rue Bleue, Éditions Gallimard
 Ma virée avec mon père, Gallimard
 Mamie Ward, L'École des Loisirs
 Rêves et cauchemars de Georges Mandard, Castor astral
 Une journée pour tout changer, followed by Mort d'un hypocondriaque, éditions du Rocher
 Au temps des vivants, Fayard and Le Livre de Poche, n° 31253
 Les Succursales du ciel, Fayard and Le Livre de Poche, n° 32303

  The three "Noires" (novels)
 Menteur, Castor astral – prix Alexandre Vialatte
 Le Libraire et l'Écrivain, Castor astral
 Le Don d'Hélène, éditions Lajouanie

 For children 
 En attendant ton retour, novel, 
 Monsieur Max ou le Dernier Combat, novel, L'École des loisirs
 Cent vingt-quatre, tale, L'École des loisirs
 Les Vélos rouillés, tale, L'École des loisirs
 Le Hold-up de la Tour Eiffel, tale, L'École des loisirs
 Le Noël du Père Noël, tale, L'École des loisirs
 Le Chauffeur de l'autocar, tale, L'École des loisirs
 La Nuit du Boufadou, tale, L'École des loisirs

Translation
Notre prof, novel by Walter Kempowski, L'École des loisirs

In collaboration
 Dictionnaire des illustrateurs, 3 volumes, with Marcus Osterwalder (illustrator), Ides et calendes

External links 
 Gérard Pussey (1980) on INA.fr
 Gérard Pussey - "Les succursales du ciel" (2009) on YouTube
 Gérard Pussey on Ricochat jeune.org
 Gérard PUSSEY on Cherche Midi

French children's writers
French literary critics
20th-century French novelists
21st-century French novelists
Roger Nimier Prize winners
People from Villeneuve-Saint-Georges
1947 births
Living people